The Dead South is a folk-bluegrass musical ensemble based in Regina, Saskatchewan, Canada. The band was initially formed in 2012 as a quartet by Nate Hilts (vocals, guitar, mandolin), Scott Pringle (guitar, mandolin, vocals), Danny Kenyon (cello, vocals) and Colton Crawford (banjo). Crawford left the band in 2015 and was replaced by studio musician Eliza Mary Doyle for several years. Crawford re-joined the band starting with the Voices In Your Head tour in mid-2018.

The band played live venues before releasing their debut five-song 2013 EP, The Ocean Went Mad and We Were to Blame. Their 2014 album Good Company was released by German label Devil Duck Records, and led to significant overseas touring for the next two years. Good Company's single "In Hell, I'll Be in Good Company", produced by Orion Paradis at SoulSound studio, was created along with a video on YouTube, and is credited as contributing to the breakthrough release for the band.

To date, The Dead South have released three EPs - The Ocean Went Mad and We Were to Blame (2013), Easy Listening for Jerks Pt. 1 (2022), Easy Listening for Jerks Pt. 2 (2022) and three studio albums: Good Company (2014), Illusion and Doubt (2016), and Sugar & Joy (2019).

History 
Nate Hilts and Danny Kenyon came up with the idea for a "rockin' stompin' bluegrass band" in 2012 while playing together in a short-lived alternative grunge band. After the grunge band's demise, Colton Crawford and Scott Pringle joined what would become the Regina-based band The Dead South. Crawford learned banjo and Pringle learned how to play the mandolin to supplement his guitar. They ended up with their own version of the bluegrass genre. They strive for a satirical view of the genre while remaining true to it.

The band toured extensively and repeatedly in Canada and Europe.  Crawford left the band in 2015, and Eliza Mary Doyle, a noted solo and studio musician, was hired to fill the vacancy. 
After almost two years of absence from the band, Colton "Crawdaddy" Crawford returned to the lineup, replacing Doyle as banjoist. On tour, Danny Kenyon was occasionally replaced on cello by Erik Mehlsen, owing to Kenyon's career in engineering.

In July 2020, allegations surfaced on the Victims Voices Regina Instagram accusing Danny Kenyon of sexual misconduct. On August 19, 2020, he temporarily left the band.
Kenyon returned on June 18 2021.

The Ocean Went Mad and We Were to Blame (2013) 

While the band played various venues, they would sell what would eventually become their self-released EP The Ocean Went Mad and We Were to Blame.

In his review of the EP, Jamie Funk of Divide and Conquer Music was initially unsure if he could handle banjo picking in every song, but ended up enjoying it. The five songs offered in the EP reminded Funk of alternative bands attempting to play bluegrass music and succeeding beyond expectations. While most of the songs are classically "knee-slapping hoedown" bluegrass, other songs bear some similarities to alternative songs from the 90's.

Good Company (2014) 

The Dead South's debut studio album Good Company was released in 2014 through the German record label Devil Duck Records, and led to extensive touring in Canada and Europe. The album contains a total of 14 tracks, including a rendition of Banjo Odyssey, which previously appeared on The Ocean Went Mad and We Were to Blame.

Additionally, The Dead South received in 2015 the "Road Gold" certification from Canadian Independent Music Association (CIMA) for over 25,000 ticket sales in a 12-month period. In presenting the award, CIMA President Stuart Johnston noted that the certification was given to recognize the talent and hard-working nature of the touring band.

In October 2016, a music video for "In Hell, I'll Be in Good Company" was released onto YouTube, retroactively fueling interest in Good Company. Though the song and respective album were released in 2015, they appeared in the Top 50 on the Billboard music charts and on the Top 20 on US iTunes overall chart during December 2017. It is The Dead South's most viewed video by a considerable margin, with over 300 million views.

Rachel Freitas of MusicExistence notes that the album's second track, Achilles, "has the signature banjo sound that The Dead South are known for, but the instrumentation is a bit lighter. What one will find quickly while listening to the LP is that The Dead South are master storytellers that really know how to bring a song to life".

Illusion & Doubt (2016) 
Illusion and Doubt was the band's second album, and was noted for its eccentric lyricism, and unusual musical influences, including its usage of a cello. Particular attention was brought to the African-American origins of its sound, with Mark Johnson of Americana UK summarising the album by saying "Bluegrass? How about blackgrass?"

Amanda Hathers, of CanadianBeats, opines that, while the album provides "the traditional folk/country experience, chock full of banjo plucking, twang and impressive harmonies, the band's ability to make the music entertaining and engaging is impressive. Boots, the album's first track, begins soft and quiet before picking up speed before its end. Miss Mary in particular, serves as an atypical and surprising example of folk music as interpreted by The Dead South and Hard Day showcases Hilts' grit and power as vocalist."

Apart from Illusion and Doubt peaking at number five on the US Billboard Bluegrass chart, it also entered the top 30 on the US Country iTunes Chart.

The band received a Juno Award for Juno Award for Traditional Roots Album of the Year in 2018 for "Illusion and Doubt".

By March 2019, Good Company and Illusion and Doubt had sold 90,000 physical copies, and The Dead South's songs had a total of 55 million streams on Spotify.

Sugar & Joy (2019) 

Sugar & Joy is The Dead South's most recent album to date, which expanded upon the imagery and unconventional composition in Illusion and Doubt. The album was very well received critically, reaching #1 on the American bluegrass charts.
Peter Churchill of Americana UK gave the album a 9/10, writing "There is a feeling, when first listening to the album, of anticipation, of wondering in what direction these bunch of outrageously talented musicians might head with the next track. The only consistent here is the quality and the sheer infectiousness of the music."

Chris Conaton of PopMatters gave it an 8/10, praising the diversity of the themes and the manner in which it incorporated different styles of music: "Sugar and Joy shows there's a lot of life in the corner of roots music where playing loud and fast while also leaving room for slower, more nuanced songs is considered a great combination. It's nice to hear an album that embraces the core tenets of 21st-century Americana (or Canadiana, in the Dead South's case) while still doing their own thing. Sugar and Joy is one of the most entertaining albums I've heard in 2019."

The Dead South won Group of the Year at the 2019 Canadian Independent Music Awards, or "Indies", on 11 May 2019.  The Dead South again received a Juno Award for best Traditional Roots Album of the Year in 2020 for "Sugar & Joy", and performed via livestream during the virtual award ceremony.

Easy Listening for Jerks Pt. 1 and 2 (2022-present)
In October 2021, it was announced that The Dead South would be releasing a double EP Easy Listening for Jerks Pt. 1 and Easy Listening for Jerks Pt. 2 which has a scheduled release date of 4 March 2022.  They are covers EPs which are described as "The Carter Family meets Addams Family."  Part 1 has their bluegrass takes on classics such as "You Are My Sunshine," "Keep on the Sunny Side," and The Country Gentlemen's "Matterhorn".  Part 2 is from their pre-show playlist which includes covers of The Doors, System of a Down, Cold War Kids, and The Misfits.  This double EP release has all four members taking turns on vocals.

On 7 October 2021, they released the first single "You Are My Sunshine" along with the accompanying music video.  On 11 November, they released their next single which is their cover of The Doors' "People Are Strange" along with the accompanying video.

On 8 June 2022, the Western Canadian Music Awards nominations were announced.  The Dead South were nominated in the category of Recording of the Year.

Musical style and influence 

The band refers to themselves as "Mumford and Sons' Evil Twins", a nod to their dark and often violent interpretation of the "aesthetic of old western pioneers". Freitas of MusicExistence notes the "evil twin" comparison, but considers that, with Good Company, the band stands on its own merit in the folk world. Hilts and Kenyon had been listening to bluegrass bands Trampled by Turtles and Old Crow Medicine Show before forming their own band. They agreed that they wanted to perform their own version of traditional folk and bluegrass. AllMusic reviewer Timothy Monger considers that tradition to be "a gritty punk ethos with traditional bluegrass and old-time string band music"

In their review of Good Company, Sputnik Music notes that the band includes songs about the usual: lovin', cheatin', killin' and drinkin'." Sputnik Music also points out that the band's clothing style of ordinary white shirts, black trousers, black suspenders and the occasional flat-brimmed hat is often mimicked by their fans. RJ Frometa, of Vents Magazine, notes the odd clothing style – referred to by the band itself as "their distinctive hillbilly cum pioneer look" – as well, considering them "fun, modern-day hillbillies who marry an incredible stage presence with their distinct country twang that includes banjos, mandolins, a cello, guitars, whistles, finger snapping and occasionally some head banging." Frometa opines that The Dead South strive to create a sarcastic sound all their own.

Sarah Murphy of Exclaim.ca says that the band's injection of folk and bluegrass sounds with a "punk rock ethos (not to mention a banjo player who's a self-proclaimed metalhead), the band bring a fresh perspective to classic genres."

MusicCrowns.org reviewer James Cooke suggests that the band's "gritty vocals, aggressive guitar strumming, mandolin chops, banjo licks and a steady kick drum to fuse it all together" deliver a unique sound that doesn't exactly fit the traditional definition of bluegrass.

Cooke notes that The Dead South's release of "In Hell, I'll Be in Good Company" is labelled as bluegrass, but has caused fans to question whether the label is appropriate or not. He argues that since bluegrass has been influenced by Irish, Scottish, and African American music, the definition of bluegrass as a genre has become blurred.

Banjo Odyssey Controversy

The lyrical content of The Dead South's song "Banjo Odyssey" off their 2014 album Good Company has been in question since its release, but became more so following the allegations published against Danny Kenyon.  In an August 2014 Facebook post, the band said: "The song is a satirical, tongue-in-cheek reference to the bluegrass genre and tells a story about two cousins who engage in a relationship.  We sincerely apologize to anyone who has been hurt or offended by these lyrics, as the last thing we would want to do is offend anyone.  Obviously, we do not condone rape or violence, and "Banjo Odyssey" (like many of our songs) is written as a story, and not as something to be taken literally."

Six Shooter Records, who represent The Dead South, released a statement on 19 August 2020 saying they are discussing the song "Banjo Odyssey" and "our responsibility as a record label with respect to both artistic expression and social responsibility. We feel it is important to allow the time for a thoughtful and thorough process before taking action."  The band also said on the same day that it "is opposed to, and does not condone, harmful behaviour of any kind."

The Dead South continues to take steps to be "part of the solution," including supporting victims organizations, discussing the impact of their song "Banjo Odyssey", implementing training for band and team members and creating a code of conduct to adhere to. The band began training themselves and crew on consent, professional conduct, and creating safe spaces for their fans and the team.

Band members 

Current members
 Nate Hilts (lead vocals, guitar, mandolin) (2012–present)
 Scott Pringle (guitar, mandolin, vocals) (2012–present)
 Colton Crawford (banjo) (2012–2015, 2018–present)
 Danny Kenyon (cello, vocals) (2012–2020, 2021-present)

Former members

 Eliza Mary Doyle (banjo) (2016–2018)
 Erik Mehlsen (cello) (2015–2018)

Discography

Albums

Studio albums

Live albums

Extended plays

Singles

Music videos
{| class="wikitable"
|-
!Year
!Title
!Album
|-
|2013
|"Long Gone"
|rowspan=5|Good Company
|-
|2014
|"The Recap"
|-
|2015
|"Honey You"
|-
|rowspan=2|2016
|"Banjo Odyssey" 
|-
|"In Hell I'll Be In Good Company"
|-
|2017
|"Delirium"
|rowspan=3|Illusion & Doubt
|-
|rowspan=2|2018
|"Miss Marry"
|-
|"Boots"
|-
|2019
|"Diamond Ring"
|rowspan=2|Sugar & Joy
|-
|2020
|"Fat Little Killer Boy"
|-
|rowspan=2|2021
|"You Are My Sunshine"
|Easy Listening for Jerks Pt. 1
|-
|"People Are Strange"
|rowspan=2|Easy Listening for Jerks Pt. 2'
|-
|2022
|"Chop Suey"
|}

 Awards and nominations 

 Pop culture 

"In Hell, I'll Be in Good Company" was used in season 2 episode 6 end credits of The Umbrella Academy.
"In Hell, I'll Be in Good Company" was used in season 3 episode 1 of American Gods.
"In Hell, I'll Be in Good Company" is playable as a random song via the jukebox in Fort Hope in Turtle Rock Studios game Back 4 Blood.
The score for "In Hell, I'll Be in Good Company" was used in season 1 episode 2 and season 1 episode 6 of The Letter for the King"The Recap" is used during the chase scene at the end of Season 1, Episode 8 of Tin Star'' and continues into the credits.

References

External links
 
 
  CanadianBands.com entry
 The Dead South at AllMusic
 

Canadian folk music groups
Canadian bluegrass music groups
Musical groups established in 2012
Musical groups from Regina, Saskatchewan
Juno Award for Traditional Roots Album of the Year winners
2012 establishments in Saskatchewan
Six Shooter Records artists